Mohammad Dabre (born 22 January 2003) is an Italian professional footballer who plays as a midfielder for Worthing on loan from Swindon Town.

Career
Dabre played at youth level for Lecco before moving to England. He then joined the Volenti Academy.

On 4 August 2021, Dabre signed for EFL side Swindon Town, and made his senior debut the following month in the EFL Trophy fixture against Arsenal U21. Dabre scored the opening goal in a 2–1 victory for Swindon.

He moved on loan to Chippenham Town in February 2022. Other loan spells followed, firstly to Banbury United in September 2022 and then, in November 2022, to Worthing. In February 2023, he returned to Worthing on loan until the end of the season.

Career statistics

References

2003 births
Living people
Italian footballers
Association football midfielders
Calcio Lecco 1912 players
Swindon Town F.C. players
Chippenham Town F.C. players
Banbury United F.C. players
Worthing F.C. players
National League (English football) players
Italian expatriate footballers
Italian expatriates in England
Expatriate footballers in England